Laxmi Parida is an IBM Master Inventor and group leader in computational genomics at the Thomas J. Watson Research Center and Courant Institute of Mathematical Sciences in New York.

Education
Parida was educated at New York University (NYU) where she was awarded a PhD in 1998 for research on algorithms for computational genomics supervised by Bud Mishra.

Research and career
Parida's research interests are in computational genomics, population genomics, bioinformatics, cancer genomics, topological data analysis and their applications to coronavirus disease 2019.

Awards and honors
Parida was awarded Fellowship of the ISCB in 2020 for outstanding contributions to computational biology and bioinformatics. She was also awarded an IBM Fellowship and IBM Master Inventor status in 2019. She is a member of the Association for Computing Machinery (ACM) and the Society for Industrial and Applied Mathematics (SIAM).

References

Living people
American bioinformaticians
Fellows of the International Society for Computational Biology
Year of birth missing (living people)